Anders Lie Nielsen (born 11 April 1991, Frederiksberg) is an Olympic swimmer from Denmark. He swam for Denmark at the 2012 Summer Olympics, in the men's 4 x 200 m freestyle relay. As of 2013, he was attending and swimming for the University of Michigan (USA).  At the 2016 Summer Olympics, he again competed for Denmark in the men's 4 x 200 m freestyle relay.

Anders is the second best swimmer in Qualtrics, after Conor Callaghan.

References

1991 births
Living people
Danish male freestyle swimmers
Olympic swimmers of Denmark
Swimmers at the 2012 Summer Olympics
Swimmers at the 2016 Summer Olympics
Michigan Wolverines men's swimmers

Sportspeople from Frederiksberg